is a Japanese mixed martial artist who competed in the welterweight and lightweight divisions in Shooto, Strikeforce and DEEP. He was the SuperBrawl 7 Light Heavyweight Tournament winner, defeating Ben Hernandez in the finals.



Championships and Accomplishments
All Japan Amateur Shooto
3rd All Japan Amateur Shooto Championship Middleweight Tournament runner up (1996)
Icon Sport
SuperBrawl 7 Light Heavyweight Tournament Winner

Mixed martial arts record

|-
| Win
| align=center| 20-10
| Ilya Zelik
| TKO (punches)
| Trench Warz 11 - Redemption
| 
| align=center| 2
| align=center| 2:11
| Saipan, Northern Mariana Islands
| 
|-
| Loss
| align=center| 19-10
| Yoshihiro Koyama
| TKO (punches)
| Shooto: Revolutionary Exchanges 3
| 
| align=center| 2
| align=center| 1:12
| Tokyo, Japan
| 
|-
| Loss
| align=center| 19-9
| Kenichiro Togashi
| Decision (majority)
| Shooto: Shooto Tradition Final
| 
| align=center| 3
| align=center| 5:00
| Tokyo, Japan
| 
|-
| Loss
| align=center| 19-8
| Gilbert Melendez
| Decision (unanimous)
| Strikeforce: Playboy Mansion
| 
| align=center| 3
| align=center| 5:00
| Beverly Hills, California, United States
| 
|-
| Loss
| align=center| 19-7
| Joe Camacho
| TKO
| PXC 11 - No Turning Back
| 
| align=center| 2
| 
| Guam
| 
|-
| Win
| align=center| 19-6
| Alexei Maligin
| Submission (rear naked choke)
| Kokoro - Kill Or Be Killed
| 
| align=center| 1
| align=center| 3:53
| Tokyo, Japan
| 
|-
| Win
| align=center| 18-6
| Toby Imada
| TKO (punches)
| FFCF 6 - Undisputed
| 
| align=center| 1
| align=center| 0:13
| Mangilao, Guam
| 
|-
| Loss
| align=center| 17-6
| Vítor Ribeiro
| Submission (arm triangle choke)
| Rumble on the Rock 7
| 
| align=center| 3
| align=center| 2:32
| Hawaii, United States
| 
|-
| Win
| align=center| 17-5
| Jason Dent
| Decision
| SB 35 - SuperBrawl 35
| 
| align=center| 3
| align=center| 5:00
| Hawaii, United States
| 
|-
| Loss
| align=center| 16-5
| Adam Lynn
| Decision
| FFCF 1 - Fury Full Contact Fighting 1
| 
| align=center| 4
| 
| Guam
| 
|-
| Loss
| align=center| 16-4
| Dokonjonosuke Mishima
| Decision (majority)
| Deep - 12th Impact
| 
| align=center| 3
| align=center| 5:00
| Tokyo, Japan
| 
|-
| Win
| align=center| 16-3
| Brian Gassaway
| Decision (unanimous)
| Shooto - 3/18 in Korakuen Hall
| 
| align=center| 3
| align=center| 5:00
| Tokyo, Japan
| 
|-
| Win
| align=center| 15-3
| Seichi Ikemoto
| Decision (unanimous)
| Shooto - To The Top Final Act
| 
| align=center| 3
| align=center| 5:00
| Tokyo, Japan
| 
|-
| Win
| align=center| 14-3
| Ray Cooper
| Decision (unanimous)
| Shooto - To The Top 6
| 
| align=center| 3
| align=center| 5:00
| Tokyo, Japan
| 
|-
| Loss
| align=center| 13-3
| Anderson Silva
| Decision (unanimous)
| Shooto - To The Top 2
| 
| align=center| 3
| align=center| 5:00
| Tokyo, Japan
| 
|-
| Win
| align=center| 13-2
| Dan Gilbert
| Submission (rear naked choke)
| Shooto - R.E.A.D. Final
| 
| align=center| 1
| align=center| 4:28
| Tokyo, Japan
| 
|-
| Win
| align=center| 12-2
| Thomas Denny
| Decision (unanimous)
| Shooto - R.E.A.D. 10
| 
| align=center| 3
| align=center| 5:00
| Tokyo, Japan
| 
|-
| Loss
| align=center| 11-2
| Hayato Sakurai
| Decision (split)
| Shooto - R.E.A.D. 2
| 
| align=center| 3
| align=center| 5:00
| Tokyo, Japan
| <small>For the Shooto Middleweight Championship
|-
| Win
| align=center| 11-1
| Angelo Sergio
| Submission (punches)
| VTJ 1999 - Vale Tudo Japan 1999
| 
| align=center| 1
| align=center| 7:45
| Tokyo, Japan
| 
|-
| Win
| align=center| 10-1
| Rhett Anthony
| Submission (rear naked choke)
| SB 14 - SuperBrawl 14
| 
| align=center| 1
| align=center| 4:18
| Guam
| 
|-
| Win
| align=center| 9-1
| Jutaro Nakao
| Decision (unanimous)
| Shooto - 10th Anniversary Event
| 
| align=center| 3
| align=center| 5:00
| Yokohama, Japan
| 
|-
| Win
| align=center| 8-1
| Hiroyuki Kojima
| TKO (punches)
| Shooto - Las Grandes Viajes 6
| 
| align=center| 2
| align=center| 4:28
| Tokyo, Japan
| 
|-
| Win
| align=center| 7-1
| Alex Cook
| Decision (unanimous)
| Shooto - Las Grandes Viajes 5
| 
| align=center| 3
| align=center| 5:00
| Tokyo, Japan
| 
|-
| Win
| align=center| 6-1
| Ben Hernandez
| Submission (rear naked choke)
| SB 7 - SuperBrawl 7
| 
| align=center| 1
| align=center| 1:38
| Guam
| SuperBrawl 7 Light Heavyweight Tournament Finals. Wins SuperBrawl 7 Light Heavyweight Tournament
|-
| Win
| align=center| 5-1
| Luke Ishizaki
| Submission (armbar)
| SB 7 - SuperBrawl 7
| 
| align=center| 1
| align=center| 1:43
| Guam
| SuperBrawl 7 Light Heavyweight Tournament Semifinals
|-
| Win
| align=center| 4-1
| Patrick Madayag
| Submission (choke)
| SB 7 - SuperBrawl 7
| 
| align=center| 1
| align=center| 3:33
| Guam
| SuperBrawl 7 Light Heavyweight Tournament Quarterfinals
|-
| Win
| align=center| 3-1
| Koichi Tanaka
| Technical Submission (armbar)
| Shooto - Las Grandes Viajes 1
| 
| align=center| 1
| align=center| 1:01
| Tokyo, Japan
| 
|-
| Loss
| align=center| 2-1
| Jutaro Nakao
| Submission (armbar)
| Shooto - Reconquista 3
| 
| align=center| 3
| align=center| 4:56
| Tokyo, Japan
| 
|-
| Win
| align=center| 2-0
| Masato Fujiwara
| Decision (unanimous)
| Shooto - Gig
| 
| align=center| 2
| align=center| 5:00
| Tokyo, Japan
| 
|-
| Win
| align=center| 1-0
| Hiroyuki Kojima
| Decision (unanimous)
| Shooto - Reconquista 2
| 
| align=center| 2
| align=center| 5:00
| Tokyo, Japan
|

References

External links

Living people
Japanese male mixed martial artists
Lightweight mixed martial artists
Welterweight mixed martial artists
Mixed martial artists utilizing judo
Japanese male judoka
Year of birth missing (living people)